The Super 18 Model S18-180 is an FAA type certificated light aircraft evolved from the Piper PA-18 Super Cub.

Design and development
The Super 18-180 is a strut-braced, high-wing monoplane with conventional landing gear. The fuselage is constructed with welded steel tubing with aircraft fabric covering. The design is based on the Piper PA-18 with improvements. These include a wide cabin, slotted leading edges and enlarged flaps.

The Super 18-180 was FAA type certificated in 2009.

Variants
Dakota Cub Super 18
Dakota Cub is operated as a separate company building the experimental homebuilt variant of the Super 18 series.

Specifications (Super 18-180)

References

External links

Homebuilt aircraft